Pedro Flores (died 1540) was a Roman Catholic prelate who served as Bishop of Gaeta (1537–1540) and Bishop of Castellammare di Stabia (1502–1537).

Biography
On 26 November 1502, Pedro Flores was selected as Bishop of Castellammare di Stabia and confirmed by Pope Julius II on 29 November 1503.

On 31 January 1537, he was transferred by Pope Paul III to the diocese of Gaeta.

He served as Bishop of Gaeta until his death on 3 May 1540.

Episcopal succession
While bishop, he was the principal co-consecrator of:
Paolo Giovio (il Vecchio), Bishop of Nocera de' Pagani (1533);
Marcantonio della Croce, Bishop of Tivoli (1533); 
Bernardo Antonio de' Medici, Bishop of Forlì (1533); 
Braccio Martelli, Bishop of Fiesole (1533); 
Bartolomeo Ferratini, Bishop of Sora (1533); and
Sebastiano de Bonfilii, Bishop of Telese o Cerreto Sannita (1533).

References

External links and additional sources
 (for Chronology of Bishops) 
 (for Chronology of Bishops) 
 (for Chronology of Bishops) 
 (for Chronology of Bishops) 
 (for Chronology of Bishops) 
 (for Chronology of Bishops) 

16th-century Italian Roman Catholic bishops
Bishops appointed by Pope Julius II
Bishops appointed by Pope Paul III
1540 deaths